The 2001 Speedway World Cup Qualifying round 1 was the first race of the 2001 Speedway World Cup season. It took place on July 1, 2001 in the Speedway Stadium in Gdańsk, Poland.

Results

Heat details

Heat after heat 
 Loram, Ułamek, Reima, Pingel
 Stonehewer, Mir.Kowalik, Kylmaekorpi, Riss
 Protasiewicz, Kugelmann, Laukkanen, Hurry
 T.Gollob, Richardson, Nieminen, Rudolph
 Cegielski, Havelock, Kokko, Mell
 Ułamek, Rudolph, Stonehewer, Laukkanen
 Loram, Mir.Kowalik, Kugelmann, Nieminen (e4)
 Protasiewicz, Richardson, Riss, Reima
 T.Gollob, Kylmaekorpi, Pingel, Hurry
 Havelock, Cegielski, Laukkanen (joker), Mell
 Ułamek, Loram (joker), Nieminen, Riss
 Richardson, Laukkanen, Mir.Kowalik, Pingel
 Protasiewicz, Loram, Kylmaekorpi, Rudolph
 T.Gollob, Kugelmann, Stonehewer, Reima
 Cegielski, Kylmaekorpi, Havelock, Pingel
 Richardson, Mir.Kowalik, Rudolph, Reima
 Ułamek, Kugelmann, Kylmaekorpi, Richardson (e4)
 Protasiewicz, Stonehewer, Nieminen, Pingel
 T.Gollob, Loram, Laukkanen, Riss
 Cegielski, Havelock, Nieminen, Mell
 Cegielski, Stonehewer, Kugelmann (joker), Reima
 Ułamek, Havelock, Nieminen, Riss
 Richardson, Laukkanen, Protasiewicz, Rudolph
 Loram, T.Gollob, Kugelmann, Kylmaekorpi

See also 
 Motorcycle speedway

References 

E1